Bezirk Mistelbach is a district of the state of Lower Austria in Austria.

Municipalities
Suburbs, hamlets and other subdivisions of a municipality are indicated in small characters.
Altlichtenwarth
Asparn an der Zaya
Altmanns, Michelstetten, Olgersdorf, Schletz
Bernhardsthal
Bernhardsthal, Katzelsdorf, Reintal
Bockfließ
Drasenhofen
Drasenhofen, Fünfkirchen, Kleinschweinbarth, Steinebrunn, Stützenhofen
Falkenstein
Fallbach
Fallbach, Friebritz, Hagenberg, Hagendorf, Loosdorf
Gaubitsch
Altenmarkt, Gaubitsch, Kleinbaumgarten
Gaweinstal
Atzelsdorf, Gaweinstal, Höbersbrunn, Martinsdorf, Pellendorf, Schrick
Gnadendorf
Eichenbrunn, Gnadendorf, Oedenkirchenwald, Pyhra, Röhrabrunn, Wenzersdorf, Zwentendorf
Groß-Engersdorf
Großebersdorf
Eibesbrunn, Großebersdorf, Manhartsbrunn, Putzing
Großharras
Diepolz, Großharras, Zwingendorf
Großkrut
Althöflein, Ginzersdorf, Großkrut, Harrersdorf
Hausbrunn
Herrnbaumgarten
Hochleithen
Bogenneusiedl, Traunfeld, Wolfpassing an der Hochleithen
Kreuttal
Hautzendorf, Hornsburg, Ritzendorf, Unterolberndorf
Kreuzstetten
Niederkreuzstetten, Oberkreuzstetten, Streifing
Laa an der Thaya
Hanfthal, Kottingneusiedl, Laa an der Thaya, Ruhhof, Ungerndorf, Wulzeshofen
Ladendorf
Eggersdorf, Garmanns, Grafensulz, Herrnleis, Ladendorf, Neubau, Pürstendorf
Mistelbach an der Zaya
Ebendorf, Eibesthal, Frättingsdorf, Hörersdorf, Hüttendorf, Kettlasbrunn, Lanzendorf, Mistelbach, Paasdorf, Siebenhirten
Neudorf bei Staatz
Kirchstetten, Neudorf bei Staatz, Rothenseehof, Zlabern
Niederleis
Helfens, Kleinsitzendorf, Niederleis, Nodendorf
Ottenthal
Guttenbrunn, Ottenthal
Pillichsdorf
Poysdorf
Altruppersdorf, Erdberg, Föllim, Ketzelsdorf, Kleinhadersdorf, Poysbrunn, Poysdorf, Walterskirchen, Wetzelsdorf, Wilhelmsdorf
Rabensburg
Schrattenberg
Staatz
Ameis, Enzersdorf bei Staatz, Ernsdorf bei Staatz, Kautendorf, Staatz, Waltersdorf bei Staatz, Wultendorf
Stronsdorf
Oberschoderlee, Patzenthal, Patzmannsdorf, Stronegg, Stronsdorf, Unterschoderlee
Ulrichskirchen-Schleinbach
Kronberg, Schleinbach, Ulrichskirchen
Unterstinkenbrunn
Wildendürnbach
Alt-Prerau, Neuruppersdorf, Pottenhofen, Wildendürnbach
Wilfersdorf
Bullendorf, Ebersdorf an der Zaya, Hobersdorf, Wilfersdorf
Wolkersdorf im Weinviertel
Münichsthal, Obersdorf, Pfösing, Riedenthal, Wolkersdorf im Weinviertel

 
Districts of Lower Austria